Fear is a  1996 American psychological thriller film directed by James Foley and written by Christopher Crowe. It stars Mark Wahlberg, Reese Witherspoon, William Petersen, Alyssa Milano and Amy Brenneman. It revolves around a wealthy family whose seemingly perfect life is threatened when their teenage daughter begins dating an attractive and mysterious young man.

The film was largely derided by critics upon its release, but became a sleeper hit in the spring of 1996, grossing $20 million at the U.S. box office. It has since become a cult film, while at the same time launching teen idol status for its two young leads, who were romantically linked at the time of the movie's premiere. Wahlberg was nominated for the MTV Movie Award for Best Villain.

The film's own producer, Brian Grazer, described it as "Fatal Attraction for teens".

Plot
Sixteen-year-old Nicole Walker lives in the suburbs of Seattle with her father Steven, his new wife Laura, and Laura's son Toby. At a cafe with her best friend Margo Masse and friend Gary Rohmer, Nicole meets David McCall, and instantly falls for his good looks and charm. Nicole falls in love with David, but Steven dislikes him, and grows angry with him when he disregards Nicole's curfew and, eventually, has sex with her. David soon becomes possessive and jealous over Nicole, culminating in attacking Gary when he sees them hugging, beating him up and giving Nicole a black eye. As a result, she breaks up with him, but they get back together when David apologizes for his action, and later manipulates her into believing her father assaulted him.

David invites Nicole to a party at his friend Logan's house. At first, she declines but then decides to drive to the party, where she witnesses Margo smoking crack and having sex with David, although Nicole does not realise it is not consensual. The following day, she confronts him about his infidelity and breaks up with him for good, and also confronts Margo, not believing that David raped her. David then threatens Margo to convince Nicole to take him back. After seeing Nicole with Gary, David follows and kills him.

Nicole goes with Laura and Toby to the mall, where David corners her in the women's restroom, vowing to her that he will not let anyone stand in the way of him having Nicole for himself. Meanwhile, Steven finds his car vandalized with an insulting note left by David. Furious, Steven breaks into the house David shares with Logan and vandalizes it after discovering a shrine David made for Nicole. In retaliation for Steven's vandalism, David decides to break into the Walkers' residence with his four friends: Logan, Hacker, Knobby, and Terry, aiming to harm Nicole's family and take Nicole for himself.

After Margo informs the Walkers of Gary's death, David and his gang behead Kaiser, the family dog, then make multiple attempts to break inside. Steven and Laura barricade the doors, and Laura injures Hacker with a drill, and he is then taken to the hospital by Knobby. Using a flashlight, Nicole sends an SOS to the Walkers' private security guard, Larry, who arrives to confront the situation, but is killed by Terry. David, Logan, and Terry take Steven hostage, forcing Laura to surrender. Toby escapes through a window and gets to Laura's car phone. After Terry finds him in the garage, Toby fatally runs Terry over with the SUV. Logan forces himself onto Nicole; Margo intervenes, but is knocked unconscious.

David shoots Logan dead for attempting to rape Nicole, and then tells her that he intends to kill her father so he can finally have Nicole, believing that Nicole will get over it and accept him. After Toby retrieves Larry's keys and releases his parents, Steven rushes at David, but David takes him down and gets ready to kill him, until Nicole saves her father by impaling David in the back with a peace pipe (a gift from David himself). As a hurt David looks at Nicole in shock, Steven gets back up and brawls with him. An enraged David attempts to attack Nicole, but Steven furiously throws him to his death through the bedroom window. The family embrace each other as the police and the paramedics arrive.

Cast
 Mark Wahlberg as David McCall
 Reese Witherspoon as Nicole Walker
 William Petersen as Steve Walker
 Amy Brenneman as Laura Walker
 Alyssa Milano as Margo Masse
 Gary Riley as Hacker
 Jed Rees as Knobby
 Todd Caldecott as Gary Rohmer
 Andrew Airlie as Alex McDowell
 Christopher Gray as Toby
 Tracy Fraim as Logan
 Jason Kristofer as Terry
 Gerry Bean (using the pseudonym John Oliver) as Eddie Clark
 David Fredericks as Larry O'Brien
 Banner (dog) as Kaiser

Production
In March 1994, it was announced that Imagine Entertainment was in the process of putting together a thriller written by Christopher Crowe titled No Fear with negotiations James Foley to direct.

Release 

Fear was released on April 12, 1996, in 1,584 theaters. It opened at number four at the box office, making $6.3 million in its opening weekend. By the end of its run, the film earned $20.8 million in the US.

Soundtrack 

 "Jessica" by The Allman Brothers Band
 "Green Mind" by Dink
 "Comedown" by Bush
 "Wild Horses" by The Sundays
 "Machinehead" by Bush
 "Something's Always Wrong" by Toad the Wet Sprocket
 "Animal" by Prick
 "Stars and Stripes Forever" by C.H.S Municipal Band
 "The Illist" by Marky Mark
 "Irie Vibe" by One Love.

Reception
Fear holds a 46% approval rating on Rotten Tomatoes  based on 39 reviews, with an average rating of 5.20/10. The site's consensus reads: "Fear has an appealing young cast, but their efforts aren't enough to consistently distract from an increasingly overblown - and illogical - teen stalker story". On Metacritic it has a score of 51% based on reviews from 16 critics, indicating "mixed or average reviews".

Mick LaSalle of the San Francisco Chronicle said, "Fear is hard to resist. On one hand it's a shameless thriller that makes up for the inevitability of its story by consistently being bigger, faster and more appalling than you might expect. On the other hand, it contains enough truth about fathers, teenaged daughters and young lust to distinguish it from most thrillers and ground it in vivid emotion. It is a nightmare fantasy for fathers. Director James Foley and screenwriter Christopher Crowe keep raising the stakes all the way to a finish that's something out of The Straw Dogs. It's a maddening, satisfying, junky, enjoyable picture."

Owen Gleiberman of Entertainment Weekly gave the film a positive review, further accrediting the comparisons to Fatal Attraction, writing: "Fear is a teen Fatal Attraction, and — surprise — it isn’t bad." He did, however, criticise the finale: "[Director] James Foley does a fine job evoking the sexual tensions between father, daughter, and rogue suitor, but he has less luck with the (inevitable) garish climax, which is so unconvincingly staged it never even makes it over the top".

Gene Siskel gave the film a thumbs-down while Roger Ebert gave it a thumbs-up. Siskel called the picture "Predictable trash with an 'inspired' title, and with a third act which nosedives into pure mayhem...It's shocking that such a film was made by the same director who gave us At Close Range, Glengary Glen Ross, and After Dark, My Sweet; this one is not worthy of his talent. It should have been titled Who's That Boy." Ebert claimed the movie "generates genuine psychological interest, with an effective and suspenseful portrait of a family under siege."

Movie historian Leonard Maltin gave the picture two out of four stars: "This passable slasher epic benefits from taut, stylish direction and from decent performances; still, it's awfully derivative -- especially the climactic showdown. Mark Wahlberg is menacing as the lovestruck hood, but he could benefit from diction lessons."

Critical revaluation of the film has proved more positive than its initial reception, with Carter Burwell's score being especially well received. One critic has since stated that "although dismissed by some reviewers upon its release as a sensationalist, hysterical, formulaic piece, Fear has improved with age".  The film was placed as No. 19 on Bravo TV's "30 Even Scarier Movie Moments".

Remake
On May 23, 2019, it was announced that Universal Pictures and Imagine Entertainment would produce a remake of the film with Brian Grazer producing again, along with Karen Lunder as co-producer. Jonathan Herman will adapt Crowe's script for a modern audience. Amandla Stenberg will star.

Television series
In October 2022, it was reported that a television series adaptation of the film is in development at Peacock.

See also
 List of films featuring home invasions
 Darr

References

External links
 
 
 
 

1996 films
1996 drama films
1996 thriller films
1990s English-language films
1990s erotic thriller films
1990s psychological drama films
1990s psychological thriller films
1990s teen drama films
1990s thriller drama films
American erotic thriller films
American films about revenge
American neo-noir films
American psychological drama films
American psychological thriller films
American teen drama films
American thriller drama films
Films about domestic violence
Films about fear
Films about stalking
Films directed by James Foley
Films produced by Brian Grazer
Films scored by Carter Burwell
Films set in Seattle
Films shot in Vancouver
Films with screenplays by Christopher Crowe (screenwriter)
Home invasions in film
Imagine Entertainment films
Murder in films
Teen thriller films
Universal Pictures films
1990s American films